Dr. Euthanasia Sherman Meade (1836 – 1895) was a pioneer woman physician of the Pacific Coast. Dr. Meade was the first president of The Woman's Medical Club of California.

Early life 
Euthanasia Sherman was born in 1836 in Genesee, New Jersey. She was the niece of General W.T. Sherman. When she was 17 years old, she married a man her mother chose and shortly after moved to California. After the death of her only child in its birth, she turned to obstetrics, and later medicine. She returned to the East Coast and worked in hospitals during the war. In 1869, she graduated from the Woman's Medical College of Pennsylvania.

California 
When she returned to California, Dr. Meade opened an office on Mission Street in San Francisco. She was the first regular woman physician to establish herself in California. However, due to the times, she was met with little recognition in the medical profession. She developed asthma and eventually moved to San José where she practiced for 25 years. In 1876, Dr. Meade was admitted to the State Medical Society along with four other women physicians.

Death 
Dr. Meade died in 1895 due to a cerebral embolus from an endocarditis. She was cremated and her ashes placed at Cypress Lawn Cemetery.

References 

1836 births
1895 deaths
American women physicians